Concerto: One Night in Central Park is a live album by Italian tenor Andrea Bocelli.

The album was recorded September 15, 2011, during a concert at Central Park's Great Lawn in New York City. Guest performers included Celine Dion, Tony Bennett, Chris Botti, Bryn Terfel, Pretty Yende, and music producer David Foster.

PBS announced that it would broadcast the concert nationwide, as Andrea Bocelli Live in Central Park.

Immediately upon release, the album entered the Billboard Top 10 and peaked at No. 4 on the Billboard 200.

Background
It was announced that Bocelli would give a free concert, sponsored by Barilla, in September 2011, on the Great Lawn of Central Park in New York City.
After the announcement, Bocelli declared, "I cannot help but smile when thinking about the upcoming concert in Central Park. It was my father's dream, and my father was right, because my artistic path would have been entirely different without the strong and sincere embrace of this extraordinary city where everything is possible, even when it seems impossible." Bocelli continued, "My father will not be there, but I can count on his blessing and his kind and gentle smile to give me courage. My mother, sitting in the front row, will feel my father too, and they will be together again just like when I was a little boy performing on the fireplace steps. Perhaps they had secretly dreamed that I might have the opportunity to perform in New York City, and maybe right here in Central Park."

New York City Mayor Michael Bloomberg said, "The Great Lawn in Central Park is one of the most remarkable and beautiful outdoor venues in the world and it is a great pleasure to welcome Andrea Bocelli back to New York to perform there. This free concert will be a memorable cultural moment for the thousands of New Yorkers and visitors that will watch the event live in the park, and many, many more through the broadcast by WNET."

New York City Parks Commissioner Adrian Benepe said, "I join the Mayor and all New Yorkers in thanking Andrea Bocelli and all involved in making a beautiful autumn evening full of splendor and world-class music possible, in one of the most cherished outdoor places in New York City. From the Great Lawn in the heart of Manhattan to the Great Performances series on WNET, where millions more will be able to share this gift, it will be a very special occasion. A million thank yous. Grazie mille!"

During the concert that took place September 15, a rainy day, Bocelli was accompanied by the New York Philharmonic, conducted by its music director Alan Gilbert, and the Westminster Symphonic Choir. He was joined on stage by singers Celine Dion, Tony Bennett, Bryn Terfel, Ana María Martínez and Pretty Yende, instrumentalists Chris Botti,  and Nicola Benedetti, and producer David Foster.

The concert took place September 15, and was attended by 70,000 people, including Mayor Bloomberg, Sting and Donald Trump.

Release and promotion
Tickets for the concert at Central Park were made available August 4, 2011, following Bocelli's performance on Today, and the 60,000 tickets were sold out within the next few hours. The CD and DVD were released in over 70 countries, on November 15, 2011.

In November he performed "More" at the Alan Titchmarsh Show in the United Kingdom, and Dancing with the Stars in the United States, and "Amazing Grace" on The Tonight Show with Jay Leno.

Bocelli later made television appearances include BBC Breakfast and the televised concert, Children in need, at the MEN Arena, in Manchester, in the UK, and Good Morning America and The Talk, in the States, which aired in December.

Bocelli gave 5 concerts in the United States in December. In the meantime, the concert at Central Park, hosted by American journalist Paula Zahn, was airing throughout the United States and Canada, by PBS, on THIRTEEN's Great Performances series, and in Italy, by Rai 2 and Sky Uno.

In February 2012, Bocelli gave three Valentine concerts, including one at the Amway Center in Orlando, Florida, setting the all time ticket sales record by besting the previous record set by pop singer Lady Gaga.

In November and December 2012, he returned to the US to perform in six concerts.

Tour dates

Box office score data

Commercial performance
Concerto: One Night in Central Park entered the Billboard 200 at No. 4 with 87,000 copies sold, becoming Bocelli's sixth top 10 effort, while My Christmas, his 2009 album, climbed from No. 62 to 36, with 17,000 copies sold, up 83% from the previous week. On its second week, the album fell to No. 14, with nearly 65,000 copies sold, down 25%, while My Christmas fell to No. 50, with 23,000. copies. On its third week, Concerto returned to the top 10, jumping to No. 8, with 61,000 copies, down 6%, while My Christmas rebounded to  No. 17 with 35,000 copies sold, making Bocelli the only artist with two albums in the top 20 that week. The following week, Concerto jumped two spots to No. 6, with 79,000 copies sold, up 14%, while Bocelli continued to be the only artist with two albums in the top 20 for a second consecutive week, as My Christmas also rose to No. 16, with 49,000 copies sold. In its fifth week of release the album sold 76,000 more copies, down 3%, sliding just two positions to No. 8 on the chart, while my Christmas fell to No. 19, with 48,000 copies sold, giving Bocelli yet another week with 2 albums in the Top 20. On its sixth week of release, the live album dropped to No. 13, while the Christmas album dropped to No. 36, slipping to No. 2 on the Top Pop Catalog Albums chart after spending 3 straight week a top the chart. Selling a total of 460,000 copies in less than 2 month in the States, Concerto was the 8th best selling album during the 2011 holiday season.

The album entered at No. 17 on the UK Albums Chart, spending the last 6 weeks of 2011 in the top 30 of the chart. With 154,800 copies sold by year end, it finished at No. 77 on the Top 100 Best Selling Albums of 2011 list. The album also topped the Classical Compilation Albums Chart of the Official Charts Company.

Track listing

Charts and certifications

Peak positions

Year-end charts

Certifications

References

Andrea Bocelli video albums
Live video albums
2011 live albums
2011 video albums
Concerts in the United States
Albums recorded at Central Park
Free festivals
Decca Records live albums
Classical crossover albums
2011 in New York City
2011 in American music
September 2011 events in the United States